The fifth edition of the World Cup of Masters was held jointly in Austria and Italy. It was played in July 1993. This time the edition was expanded to eight "Masters" teams, each playing in two groups of fours with the group winners facing each other in the final. The teams were reigning champions Brazil, Argentina, Netherlands, hosts Italy and Austria (playing in their first tournament) Germany, Uruguay and England. The event was won by hosts Italy, winning their only title in the event.

Squads
For the list of the squads, see 1993 Copa Pelé squads.

Group A

Group A was held in Trieste, Italy.

Group B

Group B was held in Klagenfurt, Austria.

Semi-finals

Third Place Play Off

Brazil refused to play in the third place play off, disputing the matter in which they failed to qualify for the final.

Final

Goal scorers
8 goals
  Walter Schachner
3 goals
  Franco Causio

Champion

References

World Cup of Masters events
1993
1993
1993 in Brazilian football
1993 in Uruguayan football
1993–94 in Argentine football
1993–94 in German football
1993–94 in Italian football
1993–94 in English football
1993–94 in Austrian football
1993–94 in Dutch football